Juan Antonio Ugarte Pérez (born 23 September 1938 in Lima) is a Peruvian clergyman and auxiliary bishop for the Roman Catholic Diocese of Abancay, and later for Cuzco and Yauyos. He became ordained in 1967. He was appointed bishop in 1983. 
He retired in 2014.

References

External links

20th-century Roman Catholic bishops in Peru
1938 births
Living people
People from Lima
21st-century Roman Catholic bishops in Peru
Roman Catholic bishops of Abancay